Rajgarh (राजगढ़) Vidhan Sabha seat is one of the seats in Madhya Pradesh Legislative Assembly in India. It is a segment of Rajgarh Lok Sabha seat. It is part of Rajgarh District.

Members of the Legislative Assembly

See also
 Rajgarh District

References

Assembly constituencies of Madhya Pradesh